Osama Noori  (born 17 May 1958) is a former Iraqi football defender who played for Iraq at the 1982 Asian Games. 

Osama played for Iraq in 1982 .

References

Iraqi footballers
Iraq international footballers
Living people
Association football defenders
Footballers at the 1982 Asian Games
1958 births
Asian Games medalists in football
Asian Games gold medalists for Iraq
Medalists at the 1982 Asian Games